Bistaar: Chittagong Arts Complex, aka BCAC, is a self-sustained, multidisciplinary and multifaceted arts facility based in port city of Chittagong in Bangladesh. The place is also a contemporary venue for performing arts and culture in the city. Founded in late 2014 by the writer, translator and cultural personality Alam Khorshed, under a non-profit project called Chittagong Arts Trust. In 2016, it has been listed as one of the seven art organizations in South Asia by ArtX's ASEF culture360 under the Arts Management Caselet Project.

Background

Bishaud Bangla
Bishaud Bangla, served over nine years as a small-scale arts organization of different ilk, but it closed its doors in 2014, only to transform itself into a bigger and full-blown arts space.

Formation of Bistaar
After the end of Bishaud Bangla, its new incarnation, named as "Bistaar: Chittagong Arts Complex", started its artistic journey on December 29, 2014, coinciding with the birth centenary of Zainul Abedin, the pioneer of modern art movement of Bangladesh, by hosting a group paintings exhibition of the post-graduate students of the Institute of Fine Arts of the University of Chittagong as a tribute to the maestro.

Activities
Bistaar organizes arts activities like visual art exhibition, presentation, workshop, film screening, concert, dance demonstration, play, literary session etc. all year round. In addition to these, it also arranges a yearly festival named Bistaar Arts Festival (or ).

Departments
 Parampara (পরম্পরা) - gallery and event space
 Komal Gandhar (কোমল গান্ধার) - music and films archive
 Bishaud Bangla (বিশদ বাঙলা) -  souvenir shop
 Chatok Cafe (চাতক ক্যাফে) - food and drinks cafe

Gallery

Komal Gandhar - music and films archive

Chatok Cafe

References

External links

 
 

Culture in Chittagong
2014 establishments in Bangladesh